Prairie Faquetaïque is a prairie in the U.S. state of Louisiana.

Faquetaïque is a name derived from the Choctaw language meaning "turkey hen".

References

Landforms of Acadia Parish, Louisiana